Balangkas is one of the barangays of Valenzuela, Metro Manila, Philippines. Balangkas, translated to English means framework.

Balangkas is also known as the barangay with two fiestas.  Residents who live in Brgy. Balangkas celebrate the feast day of San Jose every May 1.  The fiesta of San Isidro is celebrated every May 15 for residents living in Sitio Bilog.

Demographics

Schools
 A. Deato Elementary School
 Nuestra Señora de Guia Academy (The Guian's Academy)

Religion
Roman Catholic Chapel, P. Deato Street
Balangkas Christian Baptist Church

Gallery

References

Barangays of Metro Manila
Valenzuela, Metro Manila